Coa may refer to:

Places
 Coa, Northern Ireland, a rural community in County Fermanagh, Northern Ireland
 Côa River, a tributary of the Douro, Portugal
 Combat of the Côa, part of the Peninsular War period of the Napoleonic Wars
 Prehistoric Rock Art Sites in the Côa Valley
 Quwê (or Coa), an Assyrian vassal state or province from the 9th century BC to around 627 BCE in the lowlands of eastern Cilicia
 Adana, the ancient capital of Quwê, also called Quwê or Coa

People 
 Eibar Coa (born 1971), Venezuelan jockey

Other uses
 Coa de jima, or coa, a specialized tool for harvesting agave cactus
 Coat of arms
 Coa, in Chilean Spanish, a criminal argot

See also
 COA (disambiguation)
 Coea, a genus of butterflies
 Coua, a genus of birds
 Koa, a species of tree